The Mugunghwa-ho is a class of train operated by Korail, main railway operator of South Korea. Mugunghwa trains are Korail's slowest tier of trains stopping at a number of towns and villages, and operating over a number of lines that are not served by other trains. Journey times are generally well over double that of KTX trains and 25% longer than express trains. In 1980, new express train, named 우등 (Udeung, literally meaning Premium), was introduced. Soon it was renamed as Mugunghwa-ho, which was a name of an express train operated in the 1960s. Since train classes below Mugunghwa had been retired, thus Mugunghwa trains are now the cheapest class of trains to operate cross-country. Along rural lines such as the Gyeongbuk Line, they remain the only class of passenger train operating.  They (and in some cases the Tonggeun) are the only trains to stop at many stations not served by Saemaeul-ho or KTX trains.  Mugunghwa are built to accommodate large numbers of standing passengers, and frequently have many more standees than sitting passengers.

The Mugunghwa-ho takes its name from the hibiscus syriacus, the national flower of South Korea.

Carriages and equipment
 Passenger Car: Due to the number of services operating a variety of carriages are used on Mugunghwa-ho trains, including:
 Long-length Mugunghwa-ho Passenger carriages
 Streamlined Mugunghwa-ho Passenger carriages
 Ex. Saemaeul-ho carriages
 Some Mugunghwa-ho trains contain old cafe cars which have been refurbished as subway style high-density non-reserved carriages 
 Multiple Units
 Refurbished Diesel Car (RDC): Former Commuter Diesel Car (CDC)
 New Diesel Car (Retired in 2010)
 Diesel Excellent Car (Retired in 2001)

Accidents
 On March 28, 1993, a Mugunghwa-ho train in the vicinity of Gupo station in Busan rolled over due to the collapse of a section of track caused by unauthorized tunneling below the track by the Samsung Engineering & Construction company. The derailment killed 78 people and 198 more were injured, making it the worst rail accident in the history of South Korea.
 On April 22, 2016, a Mugunghwa-ho 9-car train which departed Yongsan station at around 10:45 p.m, and headed for Yeosu Expo station on the Jeolla Line, was derailed at 3:41 a.m on a curved track intersection while approaching Yulchon station. Five out of nine cars were derailed, and two toppled down, damaging parts of the railway electrification system. The engine car toppled away from the tracks, one engine driver was killed, 7 passengers were injured and a secondary engine driver was injured. 23 people were known to be onboard the train. Upon derailment, it is known that the train crashed into an unknown object. According to Korail engineers, the locomotive was operating at 127 km/h on the curved railway intersection. As the train was approaching a platform, it was designated to operate under 50 km/h when approaching stations. After further analysis on the train's data and voice recorders, the accident seemed to be occurred by the engine driver. Legal measures are to be taken on the two engine drivers. The remaining four cars were moved away from the tracks, and the destroyed rail electrification pylons were recovered in 25 hours.

Services 
Since the retirement of Tongil-ho and Bidulgi-ho services, some of those trains are upgraded to Mugunghwa-ho trains, although they rather stop more stations. Although some of stations are closed from the retirements, stops of Mugunghwa-ho vary for each train. Listed below are lines & stops which are served by Mugunghwa-ho trains:

Note: Stops in bold are required stops.

Gyeongbu Line: Seoul, Yongsan, Yeongdeungpo, Anyang, Suwon, Osan, Seojeongni, Pyeongtaek, Seonghwan, Cheonan, Jeonui, Jochiwon, Bugang, Sintanjin, Daejeon, Okcheon, Iwon, Jitan, Simcheon, Yeongdong, Hwanggan, Chupungnyeong, Gimcheon, Gumi, Yangmok, Waegwan, Sindong, Daegu, Dongdaegu, Gyeongsan, Namseonghyeon, Cheongdo, Sangdong, Miryang, Samnangjin, Wondong, Mulgeum, Hwamyeong, Gupo, Sasang, Busan

Honam Line: Seodaejeon, Gyeryong, Yeonsan, Nonsan, Ganggyeong, Hamyeol, Iksan, Gimje, Sintaein, Jeongeup, Baegyangsa, Jangseong, GwangjuSongjeong, Naju, Dasi, Hampyeong, Muan, Mongtan, Illo, Imseong-ri, Mokpo

Jungang Line: Cheongnyangni, Deokso, Yangpyeong, Yongmun, Jipyeong, Seokbul, Ilsin, Maegok, Yangdong, Samsan, Seowonju, Wonju, Bongyang, Jecheon, Danyang, Punggi, Yeongju, Andong, Uiseong, Tap-ri, Hwabon, Sinnyeong, Bugyeongcheon, Yeongcheon, Ahwa, Singyeongju

Jeolla Line: Iksan, Samnye, Jeonju, Imsil, Osu, Namwon, Gokseong, Guryegu, Suncheon, Yeocheon, Yeosu Expo

Chungbuk Line: Daejeon, Sintanjin, Jochiwon, Osong, Cheongju, Ogeunjang, Cheongju Int'l Airport, Jeungpyeong, Eumseong, Judeok, Chungju, Samtan, Bongyang, Jecheon

Gyeongjeon Line: Samnangjin, Hallimjeong, Jinyeong, Jillye, Changwonjungang, Changwon, Masan, Jung-ri, Haman, Gunbuk, Banseong, Jinju, Wansa, Bukcheon, Hoengcheon, Hadong, Jinsang, Gwangyang, Suncheon, Beolgyo, Joseong, Yedang, Deungnyang, Boseong, Myeongbong, Iyang, Neungju, Hyocheon, Seogwangju, GwangjuSongjeong

Yeongdong Line: Yeongju, Bonghwa, Chunyang, Imgi, Hyeondong, Buncheon, Yangwon, Seungbu, Seokpo, Cheoram, Dongbaeksan, Dogye, Singi, Donghae

Taebaek Line: Jecheon, Yeongwol, Yemi, Mindungsan, Sabuk, Gohan, Taebaek, Dongbaeksan

Janghang Line: Cheonan, Asan, Onyangoncheon, Dogooncheon, Sillyewon, Yesan, Sapgyo, Hongseong, Gwangcheon, Cheongso, Daecheon, Ungcheon, Pangyo, Seocheon, Janghang, Gunsan, Daeya, Iksan

Donghae Line: Bujeon, Centum, Sinhaeundae, Gijang, Namchang, Taehwagang, Bugulsan, Singyeongju, Seogyeongju, Angang, Pohang, Wolpo, Jangsa, Ganggu, Yeongdeok

Gyeongbuk Line: Gimcheon, Oksan, Cheongni, Sangju, Hamchang, Jeomchon, Yonggung, Gaepo, Yecheon, Yeongju

Gwangju Line: GwangjuSongjeong, Geungnakgang, Gwangju

Daegu Line: Dongdaegu, Hayang, Yeongcheon

See also

 Rail transport in South Korea
 Transportation in South Korea

References

Railway coaches of South Korea
Named passenger trains of South Korea
Passenger trains of the Korail